Conceição is a Portuguese surname. Notable people with the surname include:

Abigail Conceição de Souza (1921–2007), Brazilian footballer
Cleiton Conceição (born 1978), Brazilian boxer
Ednaldo da Conceição (born 1976), Brazilian footballer
Flávio Conceição (born 1974), Brazilian footballer
Ilda Conceição (born 1957), East Timorese politician
Janina Conceição (born 1972), Brazilian volleyball player
Jean-Jacques Conceição (born 1964), Angolan-Portuguese basketball player
Jorge Wágner Goés Conceição (born 1978), Brazilian footballer
Robson Conceição (born 1988), Brazilian boxer
Rodrigo Conceição (born 2000), Portuguese footballer
Ronivaldo Conceição (born 1972), Brazilian squash player
Sérgio Conceição (born 1974), Portuguese footballer

Portuguese-language surnames